Denise Cesky (born 5 February 1976) is an Austrian sailor. She competed in the Europe event at the 2000 Summer Olympics.

References

External links
 

1976 births
Living people
Austrian female sailors (sport)
Olympic sailors of Austria
Sailors at the 2000 Summer Olympics – Europe
Sportspeople from Vienna